Bojan Marjanović (Serbian Cyrillic: Бојан Марјановић; born 26 October 1981) is a Serbian pianist and composer based in Oslo, Norway. Bojan's musical competences and interests spread from the genre of classical to improvised music and contemporary jazz. In the last years, he has been active at the Norwegian jazz scene within different projects and collaborations.

In his career, Marjanović has been awarded at national and international level, including both piano competitions and different honors. Along with the most prominent concert stages in his native country, Bojan has performed in several European countries, Canada and in the United States. In the area of classical music, Bojan's interests have been related to the integral performance of piano masterworks, such as Chopin's etudes, scherzos, preludes etc.

Biography and academics
Marjanović grew up in Valjevo, Serbia, where he started playing piano at the age of 15. Having completed a music high school "Živorad Grbić" in his hometown, Bojan continued studying classical piano performance at the Faculty of Music in Belgrade with a renowned Serbian professor Nevena Popović. In addition, he has studied with Aleksandar Madžar, Cordelia Höfer, Jean-François Antonioli, Yuri Kot, André Marchand and Kyoko Hashimoto. He received a Bachelor, Master's and DMA degree in classical piano performance from the Faculty of Music in Belgrade. Simultaneously with the classical training, he was involved in jazz and other genres which he transcribed and learned by ear.

In 2016, Marjanović moved to Oslo, Norway, where he completed Master's degree in Jazz Piano performance and Continuing studies in Jazz Composition at Norwegian Academy of Music. In Oslo, his mentors were Eyolf Dale and Helge Sunde. Along with the studies in Norway, Marjanović took a semester at Berklee College of Music where he was studying Jazz arranging and composition with Steve Rochinski, Joseph Mulholland and Brian Lewis. Marjanović currently lives in Oslo where he works as a pianist, composer and educator.

Career 
Since 2004, Marjanović has been active on Serbian music scene, both as a classical and a jazz musician. The prize at Debut International Piano Competition provided him with an opportunity for debut recital at Carnegie Hall in New York City in 2014. In Norway, Marjanović got the opportunity to participate in many projects and to perform with some of famous Norwegian jazz musicians such as Ole Morten Vågan, Thomas Strønen, Atle Nymo etc. He has given numerous performances (both solo and with different ensembles) at festivals and concerts in most European countries, as well as in Canada and the United States.

Awards and honors 
 2014: "Stanojlo Rajičić Award" for the best concert performed at Serbian Academy of Sciences and Arts within 2013 season 
 2014: 3rd prize at "Debut International Piano Competition" in New York City
 2013: Nomination for "Nagrada grada Beograda"
 2006: Finalist at "3rd Isidor Bajić Piano Memorial" - Piano Competition in Novi Sad
 2006: "Slobodanka Milošević-Savić Fund Prize" - Faculty of Music in Belgrade
 2005: "Katarina Aćimović Fund Prize" - Faculty of Music in Belgrade
 2002: 2nd prize at "Yugoslavian Federal Piano Competition" in Niš

Discography

As a leader/co-leader 
 2022: Don´t Take It So Personally, HÜM, (Losen Records)
 2018: V, with Uroš Spasojević (AMP Music & Records)

Albums as a sideman/guest 
 2019: 1.5, Uroš Spasojević (Uros Spasojevic Project)
 2018: Roots, Almir Mešković & Daniel Lazar (Etnisk musikklubb)
 2018: Where the Fishes Dance, Laila Angell (Lydmuren)
 2014: Portrait in Bass, Uroš Spasojević (Uros Spasojevic Project)

References

External links 
Official website

1981 births
Living people
People from Valjevo
Serbian pianists
Serbian composers